Thanil Kamal is a village of Chakwal District, Pakistan, located about 30 kilometres from the city of Chakwal. Nearby villages include Bhikhari, Chak kuka, Dabri, Dulla, Ghugh, Haraj, Jabbi dhok, Narag, and Pind. Thanil Kamal and Dulha may be considered "twin villages". There is a seasonal river which surrounds Thanil Kamal.

References 

Populated places in Chakwal District